Sharleen Stratton (born 9 October 1987) is an Australian diver who won gold medals at the 2006 and 2010 Commonwealth Games, and competed at the 2008 and 2012 Olympics. She is a current Australian Institute of Sport scholarship holder.

Like many other divers, Stratton started in gymnastics but switched to diving at age 12. With Briony Cole, she won gold at the Commonwealth Games in the 3 metre synchronized diving springboard event. In 2011, she won the bronze medal in the 3 m synchronised springboard at the 2011 World Aquatics Championships with Anabelle Smith.

At the London 2012 Olympics, Stratton placed fifth in the 3 m springboard and synchronised 3 m springboard, together with Anabelle Smith.

References

External links

 Australian Olympic Committee profile

1987 births
Living people
Australian female divers
Olympic divers of Australia
Commonwealth Games gold medallists for Australia
Sportswomen from Queensland
Australian Institute of Sport divers
Divers at the 2008 Summer Olympics
Divers at the 2012 Summer Olympics
Divers at the 2006 Commonwealth Games
Divers at the 2010 Commonwealth Games
Sportspeople from Brisbane
Commonwealth Games medallists in diving
People from Redland City
20th-century Australian women
21st-century Australian women
Commonwealth Games silver medallists for Australia
Medallists at the 2006 Commonwealth Games
Medallists at the 2010 Commonwealth Games